Sea Bird Island:

 Alternate name for Yerba Buena Island in San Francisco Bay
 Sea Bird Island (British Columbia), home of the Seabird Island First Nation